Osric was king of Northumbria from the death of Coenred in 718 until his death on 9 May 729. Symeon of Durham calls him a son of Aldfrith of Northumbria, which would make him a brother, or perhaps a half-brother, of Osred. Alternatively, he may have been a son of King Eahlfrith of Deira, and thus a first cousin of Osred.

Bede reports little of Osric's reign, but records that comets were seen at his death, a sign of ill omen. William of Malmesbury praises Osric for his decision to adopt Ceolwulf, brother of Coenred, as his heir.

Further reading
 Higham, N.J., The Kingdom of Northumbria AD 350-1100. Stroud: Sutton, 1993. 
 Marsden, J., Northanhymbre Saga: The History of the Anglo-Saxon Kings of Northumbria. London: Cathie, 1992.

External links
 

729 deaths
Northumbrian monarchs
8th-century English monarchs
Year of birth unknown